The Gathering is an EP by American hip hop group Living Legends. It was released on Legendary Music on April 8, 2008. It peaked at number 16 on the Billboard Heatseekers Albums, as well as number 46 on the Independent Albums chart.

Critical reception
Andrea Woo of Exclaim! said: "While some will invariably be disappointed by the short playtime, the seven tracks of The Gathering are strung together with a fairly stable energy to create a solid offering devoid of filler."

Track listing

Charts

References

External links
 

2008 EPs
Living Legends albums
Albums produced by Eligh